I Love Europe is a song written by Torgny Söderberg and Magnus Johansson, with lyrics by Ingela Forsman. It was originally performed by Christer Sjögren at Melodifestivalen 2008. On 9 February 2008, the song headed directly from the semifinal inside Scandinavium in Gothenburg to the final in the Stockholm Globe Arena on 15 March that year. Once there, the song ended up 9th. Magnus Johansson also appeared on stage as a trumpeter.

The song lyrics describe the dream of friendship and peace all across Europe, and compares the nations with one big family.

The single was released on 12 March 2008, and it peaked at 15th position at the Swedish singles chart. The song als charted at Svensktoppen for 18 weeks between 6 April–3 August 2008, peaking at 5th position. The song also appeared as a bonus track on Christer Sjögren's studio album Mitt sköna sextiotal, released in September the same year.

The song was also broguth attention by radio station RIX FM, where program host Gert Fylking launched a Rix Morronzoo campaign called Christer till Belgrad ("Christer for Belgrade"), to get people voting for the song.

At Dansbandskampen 2008 the song was performed by Larz-Kristerz, turning the song into accordion-based. The band also recorded the song for the album Hem till dig, released in February 2009.

Swedish radio program Framåt fredag did a parody called I Europa.

Single track listing
I Love Europe (radio edit)
I Love Europe (singback version)

Chart position

Contributing musicians
Christer Sjögren – lead vocals
Torgny Söderberg-  keyboards, songwriters, producer
Magnus Johansson - trumpet, keyboards, songwriter, producer
Per Lindvall - drums
Lasse Wellander - guitar
Mats Johansson - guitar
Ingela "Pling" Forsman - song lyrics

References

External links

2008 singles
Christer Sjögren songs
English-language Swedish songs
Larz-Kristerz songs
Melodifestivalen songs of 2008
Songs written by Torgny Söderberg
Songs with lyrics by Ingela Forsman
2008 songs
Songs about Europe